The second inauguration of Calvin Coolidge as president of the United States, was held on Wednesday, March 4, 1925, at the East Portico of the United States Capitol in Washington, D.C. This was the 35th presidential inauguration and marked the commencement of the second and only full term of Calvin Coolidge as president and the only term of Charles G. Dawes as vice president. Chief Justice William Howard Taft, who had served as president from 1909 to 1913, administered the oath of office. This was the first inauguration on which a former U.S. president administered the Oath and the first to be broadcast nationally on radio.

The vice-presidential oath of office was administered by the president pro tempore of the United States Senate, Albert B. Cummins. At the time, vice presidents were sworn into office in the Senate Chamber of the capitol, and would give an inaugural address before everyone headed on to the outside platform where the president would take the oath. Dawes made a fiery, half-hour address denouncing the rules of the Senate, the seniority system and many other Senate customs. Coolidge's address was barely mentioned in the news reports the next day.

See also
Presidency of Calvin Coolidge
First inauguration of Calvin Coolidge
1924 United States presidential election

References

Video of Coolidge's Second Inauguration (via YouTube)
Text of Coolidge's Inaugural Address

United States presidential inaugurations
1925 in American politics
Inauguration 2
1925 in Washington, D.C.
March 1925 events
United States National Recording Registry recordings